The 1934–35 FA Cup was the 60th season of the world's oldest football cup competition, the Football Association Challenge Cup, commonly known as the FA Cup. Sheffield Wednesday won the competition for the third time, beating West Bromwich Albion 4–2 in the final at Wembley, winning through two late goals from Ellis Rimmer.

Calendar

First round proper
At this stage 43 clubs from the Football League Third Division North and South joined the 25 non-league clubs having come through the qualifying rounds. Chesterfield, Millwall and Luton Town were given a bye to the Third Round. To make the number of matches up, non-league Dulwich Hamlet and Corinthian were given byes to this round. 34 matches were scheduled to be played on Saturday, 24 November 1934. Six were drawn and went to replays in the following midweek fixture, of which the Southport–New Brighton game went to a replay.

Second round proper
The matches were played on Saturday, 8 December 1934. Two matches were drawn, with replays taking place in the following midweek fixture.

Third round proper
The 44 First and Second Division clubs entered the competition at this stage, along with Chesterfield, Millwall and Luton Town. The matches were scheduled for Saturday, 12 January 1935. Seven matches were drawn and went to replays in the following midweek fixture, of which the Bristol City–Bury game went to a second replay.

Fourth round proper
The matches were scheduled for Saturday, 26 January 1935. Five games were drawn and went to replays in the following midweek fixture.

Fifth Round Proper
The matches were scheduled for Saturday, 16 February 1935, except for the Blackburn Rovers–Birmingham City game, which was played five days later. There were three replays, played in the next midweek fixture. Of these, the Tottenham Hotspur–Bolton Wanderers game went to a second replay.

Sixth Round Proper
The four quarter-final ties were scheduled to be played on Saturday, 2 March 1935. There were no replays.

Semi-finals
The semi-final matches were played on Saturday, 16 March 1935. Sheffield Wednesday and West Bromwich Albion won their matches to meet in the final at Wembley

Replay

Final

The 1935 FA Cup Final was contested by Sheffield Wednesday and West Bromwich Albion at Wembley. Sheffield Wednesday won the game through two late goals from Ellis Rimmer, which were needed despite having twice been ahead - West Bromwich Albion managed to equalise each time.

Match details

See also
FA Cup Final Results 1872-

References
General
Official site; fixtures and results service at TheFA.com
1934-35 FA Cup at rssf.com
1934-35 FA Cup at soccerbase.com

Specific

FA Cup seasons
FA
Cup